Ko (Hanja: 髙/高), also variously romanized Go, Goh, or Koh, is a common Korean family name. As of the 2000 South Korean census, there were 435,000 Kos in South Korea, accounting for just under 1% of the population. Liaoyang (Hanja: 遼陽) based Go (Hanja: 高) family is The Royal of Goguryeo, Northern Yan ruler Gao Yun (Hanja: 高雲), Tang Dynasty general Gao Xianzhi (Hanja: 高仙芝) has Goguryeo origin. In South Korea, Hoengseong Go clan is also descended from the Royal dynasty of Goguryeo and the clan's genealogy book specifies Dongmyeong of Goguryeo as the direct ancestor. Japan's Koma (高麗) clan is also descendant of royal dynasty of Goguryeo. Chinese character 高麗 (Koma) originates from Goguryeo's abbreviated name (Ko'gu'ryo -> Koryo), but in Japan, 'ryo' is pronounced as 'ma'. Koryo is also the name of 10 century Korea name unified and founded by Wang dynasty, a noble family originating from Goguryeo (Koguryo), and presently known name of the country, Korea (English pronunciation of Koryo).   
These Go clans in three countries are called Goguryeo Go (koguryo Ko) in common. Thus, it can be said the part 'Ko' from 'Korea' originates from the surname 'Ko', Ko(gu)ryo Dynasty surname.

Origin 
According to the Samguk Sagi, the Goguryeo royal family claimed descent from the mythical god Gao Yang, who was the grandson of the Yellow Emperor of Chinese mythology, and thus took the surname of "Go" (高); however, this legend was discredited in the commentaries by Kim Busik, the compiler of the Samguk Sagi, who concluded that both Baekje and Goguryeo originated from Buyeo.

Go or Goh 
Go Ah-sung (born 1992), South Korean actress
Go Ara (born 1990), South Korean actress and model
Go Bo-gyeol (born 1988) South Korean actress
Go Doo-shim (born 1951), South Korean actress
Go Hui-dong (1886–1965), South Korean painter
Go Hyun-jung (born 1971), South Korean actress
Go Joo-won (born 1981), South Korean actor
Goh Kun (born 1938), South Korean politician, former Prime Minister of South Korea and former Acting President of South Korea.
Go Min-si (born 1995), South Korean actress
Go Soo (born 1978), South Korean actor
Holland (born Go Tae-seob, 1996), South Korean singer
Younha (born Go Youn-ha, 1988), South Korean singer-songwriter and record producer
Ryeoun (born Go Yoon-hwan, 1998), South Korean actor
Go Yoon (born Kim Jong-min, 1988), South Korean actor
Go Youn-jung (born 1996), South Korean model and actress

Ko or Koh 
Harold Hongju Koh (born 1954), American lawyer and law professor
Howard Koh (born 1952), American politician, former United States Assistant Secretary for Health
Ko Yong-hui (born 1952), North Korean dancer and mistress of Kim Jong-il
Ko Im-pyo (born 1962), South Korean film editor
Ko Ji-yong (born 1980), South Korean singer and member of boy band Sechs Kies
Lydia Ko (born 1997), South Korea-born New Zealand golfer
Ko Moo-yeol (born 1990), South Korean footballer
Ko So-young (born 1972), South Korean actress and model
Ko Sung-hyun (born 1987), South Korean badminton player
Ko Sung-kuk (born 1955), South Korean political scientist
Ko Un (born 1933), South Korean poet
Ko Joo-yeon (born 1994), South Korean actress

See also 
List of Korean family names
Korean name

References 

Korean-language surnames

vi:Cao (họ)